Solange Magnano (2 December 1971 – November 29, 2009) was an Argentine model and beauty queen.

Life
Magnano was born in Córdoba, Argentina.  She won the Miss Argentina crown in 1994 and later created her own modeling agency.

Death
On November 29, 2009, she died of a pulmonary embolism due to complications following a cosmetic gluteoplasty she had undergone in Buenos Aires.

Personal life
She was married and was the mother of twin brothers born in 2001, named Bruno and Lautaro.

References

External links
 Solange Magnano - Argentina | Facebook

1971 births
2009 deaths
Argentine female models
Argentine people of Italian descent
Deaths from pulmonary embolism
Miss Universe Argentina winners
People from Buenos Aires
People from Córdoba Province, Argentina
Miss Universe 1994 contestants
20th-century American women
21st-century Argentine women